Astatoreochromis vanderhorsti is a species of fish in the family Cichlidae.  It is found in Burundi and Tanzania. Its natural habitat is rivers. Although often recognized as a valid species, it is likely a synonym of A. straeleni. The specific name honours the Dutch-South African zoologist Cornelius van der Horst (1889-1951).

References

External links
 FishGeeks Profile  Detailed profile including tank setup, feeding and husbandry.

vanderhorsti
Fish described in 1954
Taxonomy articles created by Polbot